Stilbene synthase  may refer to:
 Pinosylvin synthase (Pine stilbene synthase)
 Trihydroxystilbene synthase (Resveratrol synthase)